Piracy off the Somali coast has threatened international shipping since the beginning of Somalia's civil war in the early 1990s. This list documents those ships attacked in 2009: for other years, see List of ships attacked by Somali pirates.

January

February

March

April

May

June–September

October

November

December

References

Piracy in Somalia

2009 in Somalia
2009-related lists
Somalia transport-related lists